Larry Grayson (31 August 1923 – 7 January 1995), born William Sulley White, was an English comedian and television presenter. He hosted the BBC's Saturday night, peak-time, game show  The Generation Game in the 1970s and early 1980s, employing his high camp and English music hall humour.

His camp stand-up act consisted mainly of anecdotes about a cast of imaginary friends; including Everard, Apricot Lil and Slack Alice. A museum in his home town of Nuneaton displays his life and work and a memorial has been established.

Biography
Grayson was born William Sulley White in Banbury, Oxfordshire, in 1923. His parents were unmarried and he never met his father. When Grayson was ten days old, his mother, Ethel White, arranged for him to be fostered by Alice and Jim Hammonds in Nuneaton, Warwickshire. He had two foster sisters, Flo and May. His foster mother Alice died when he was six years old, and he was brought up by his elder foster sister, Flo, with whom he lived for much of his life. It has been reported that his birth mother stayed in touch with the family and was known to Grayson as "Aunt Ethel", until he discovered her true identity when he was eight years old. Larry was never formally adopted.

Grayson's sexuality was the subject of much speculation, and while he never publicly came out as gay his unpublished memoirs do discuss his sexuality. He recounted how his "one true love" had been his best friend from school days, Tom Proctor, who was killed at the age of 21 at the Battle of Monte Cassino during the Second World War. Grayson states that he never got over this loss, and he is not known to have had any other significant relationships (albeit one biographer recalls there was "a brief smokescreen" when he was said to be engaged to Crossroads actress Noele Gordon).

Homosexual relationships were illegal in England and Wales until the 1967 Sexual Offences Act (when Grayson was 44), and even after that coming out as gay would have damaged his television career. During his life Grayson was targeted by gay rights campaigners – who picketed his shows calling for him to be open about his sexuality, while the Gay Liberation Front also protested against his stereotypical camp portrayals of gay men for comedic purposes. Grayson's biographer, Tony Nicholson, observes that "many gay people acknowledge how important his contribution to camp culture was, and how his mass popularity did perhaps help spearhead greater acceptance of the LGBT community".

Early career
Grayson left school at the age of 14 and began working professionally as a supporting drag act on the comedy club circuit. He initially used the stage name Billy Breen, but changed it to Larry Grayson in the 1950s on the advice of his agent. While the origin of the name Larry is unknown, his management at the time felt a two-syllable first name would be more memorable and go better with the surname Grayson.

Over the next 30 years he toured the UK in male revues and drag shows, as well as in variety shows at venues including working men's clubs, regional theatres and the Metropolitan in London. He also added stand-up comedy to his act and developed a  gentle anecdotal style of comedy. It was usually based around his various imaginary friends such as Everard, Apricot Lil, Slack Alice, milkman Sterilised Stan, window cleaner Peek-a-boo Pete with his dirty chamois and the postman Pop-It-In Pete. A lot of his material was observational. In his early years, Grayson's family had the only telephone in the street, and his inspiration came from overhearing his neighbours using it. The "imaginary friends" were in fact based on local characters: for example, Apricot Lil worked at the local jam factory.

It was while he performed as Billy Breen at the New Pavilion Theatre Redcar (now the Regent Cinema) that he started using his familiar catchphrase "shut that door" when a side door had been left open causing a cold breeze to blow across the stage straight from the sea. During this period, Grayson was briefly managed by Eve Taylor, who renamed him Larry Grayson and is credited with being the source of the phrase, as several of her clients revealed that whenever she wanted to discuss money or personal issues with her clients she would always tell them to "shut that door". Taylor struggled to find him the right opportunities and they parted, with Grayson becoming a client of Michael Grade.

Television career
An early TV appearance in the 1950s had led to complaints about his act being too outrageous, and Grayson had resigned himself to a career off television. Then in the early 1970s his club act was seen by Michael Grade, then an agent, who signed him.
Following several successful appearances in ATV variety shows, Grade's uncle, impresario Lew Grade, gave Grayson a contract to front a show, Shut That Door! (1972), and slightly later, the Larry Grayson Show.

In 1974 he released the single "Am I Just a Pretty Face" on Pye Records.

Grayson also made two cameo appearances in the Midlands-based soap opera Crossroads, as a flouncing, difficult customer at the Crossroads Motel and as the chauffeur at the wedding of Meg Richardson, played by his close friend Noele Gordon. In real life Grayson could not drive. He also made a number of guest appearances in variety shows, chat shows and panel games.

The Generation Game
Grayson's popularity peaked when he was hired by the BBC to present the Saturday night show The Generation Game in 1978, as the replacement for Bruce Forsyth. The show was successful, once attracting an audience of 25 million (due to a strike at ITV) at its peak. Grayson was assisted by his co-star Isla St Clair, whom he frequently referred to as "my lovely Isla".

Despite its popularity, by 1981 The Generation Game was being overtaken in the ratings by ITV's rival show Game for a Laugh. Grayson decided to leave The Generation Game in 1982 while it was still relatively successful, in the expectation that the BBC would offer him another high-profile Saturday night show; this did not materialise.

Later life
Grayson went into unintentional semi-retirement, enjoying time on his own at his house in Nuneaton with his pet dogs, although he did return to television to present the game show Sweethearts for ITV in 1987. He made a number of other TV appearances and radio broadcasts, including the Tom O'Connor hosted TV quiz show A Question of Entertainment, where he was one of the team captains in 1988. Grayson moved with Flo (his adoptive older sister) to Torquay, Devon, as part of his semi-retirement, but moved back to Nuneaton after just a couple of years when he became bored and missed his close family and friends. They lived in two separate neighbouring bungalows.

Death
Grayson's final public appearance was on 3 December 1994 at the Royal Variety Performance. During this performance he referred to his hiatus from television by commenting to the audience, "They thought I was dead!".

On New Year's Eve 1994, Grayson was rushed into hospital suffering a perforated appendix. After being allowed home from hospital, Grayson died on 7 January 1995 in Nuneaton, at the age of 71. His body was buried alongside other members of his family at Oaston Road Cemetery in his home town of Nuneaton.

Obituaries
Journalist Suzi Pritchard wrote in The Guardian:

Ken Dodd, a fellow comedian, said of Grayson:

Television appearances
Camera One, 1956 – one of the acts in a televised variety show from the King's Theatre, Hammersmith.
Saturday Variety, 1971 – television show appearances.
The Leslie Crowther Show, 1971 – television show appearances.
Saturday Variety, 1972 – television show appearances.
Shut That Door!, 1972–1974 – television show host.
Crossroads, 1973 – guest appearance on the Boxing Day episode as an irate customer.
Sunday Night at the London Palladium, 1973 – television show appearances.
The Larry Grayson Hour of Stars, 1974 — television show host.
Look Who's Talking, 1974 – television show appearances.
The Larry Grayson Show, 1975–1977  television show host.
Crossroads, 1975 – guest appearance as the chauffeur of the wedding car in the episode when Meg married Hugh Mortimer.
The Good Old Days, 1976–1983 – various appearances in televised music-hall variety show.
Larry Grayson's Generation Game, 1978–1982 – television game show host (72 episodes).
At Home with Larry Grayson, 1983 – television show host.
Late Night Larry, 1983 – radio music show host.
Sweethearts, 1987 – television panel game host.
A Question of Entertainment, 1988 – Quiz show team leader

In 2009, Network DVD released a three disc set Shut That Door – Larry Grayson At ITV, which features material from his ITV days, including the one existing episode of his series Shut That Door and both series of The Larry Grayson Show.

References

External links
Larry Grayson – h2g2, Look at the Muck on 'Ere! – Part One
Larry Grayson – h2g2, Look at the Muck on 'Ere! – Part Two
Larry Grayson – h2g2, Look at the Muck on 'Ere! – Part Three
Knitting Circle – Larry Grayson biographical article
BBC Coventry article – Shut that door with Larry Grayson
Shut That Door! Larry Grayson at ITV, DVD review and biographical background
 
The Larry Grayson Collection is held by the Victoria and Albert Museum Theatre and Performance Department.

 

1923 births
1995 deaths
English male comedians
English game show hosts
English television presenters
People from Nuneaton
20th-century English comedians